Ooms is a Dutch-language surname, derived from the word oom, meaning uncle. An alternative origin may be the given name "Omaar". People with this surname include:

Amanda Ooms (born 1964), Swedish actress and writer
Hendrik Ooms (1916–1993), Dutch cyclist
Jack Ooms (1925–1999), Dutch chemical weapons researcher and diplomat
Janus Ooms (1866–1924), Dutch rower
Karel Ooms (1845–1900), Belgian painter
Klaas Ooms (1917–1970), Dutch footballer
Piet Ooms (1884–1961), Dutch swimmer and water polo player
Willem Ooms (1897–1972), Dutch cyclist

See also
Oomen, surname of the same origin

References

Dutch-language surnames
Patronymic surnames